The women's 4 x 400 metres relay at the 2006 European Athletics Championships were held at the Ullevi on 12 and 13 August.

Medalists

Schedule

Results

Heats
First 3 in each heat (Q) and the next 2 fastest (q) advance to the Final.

Final

External links
 Results

Relay 4 x 400
4 x 400 metres relay at the European Athletics Championships
2006 in women's athletics